The Nokia 7250 is a mobile phone handset manufactured by Nokia. Announced in 2002 and released for sale in February 2003, it was designed at Nokia Design Center in California, by the Bulgarian-American designer Miki Mehandjiysky. The Nokia 7250 is notable for its unconventional design, striking colours and integrated digital camera, and also had Xpress-On covers. It was the successor of Nokia 7210.

Features & Specifications
Size: 105 x 44 x 19 mm 
Weight: 92 g 
Battery standby: 150 – 300 hours 
Battery talktime: 2–5 hours 
Tri band
WAP 1.2.1, GPRS 
High Speed Data (HSCSD) - max 43.2 kilobits per second 
MMS (Multimedia Messaging Service) 
Downloadable Java applications 
Colour display (256 colours, 128 x 128 pixels) 
Polyphonic ringtones (MIDI format) 
3.5 megabytes shared memory 
Integrated stereo FM radio 
Integrated handsfree speaker 
Changeable x-press on covers 
Nokia Pop-Port connector 
Infra-red and cable connections 
Downloadable colour wallpaper 
Screensaver: digital clock 
Speed dialling 
Phone book (up to 300 entries) 
2 games (Triple Pop and Bounce) 
Clock, alarm clock, calculator, currency converter

Nokia 7250i

The Nokia 7250i is a slightly improved version of the Nokia 7250, introduced in June 2003. It includes XHTML browser, OMA Forward lock digital rights management, zoom function to magnify images and a more advanced camera. The phone has exactly the same design as the 7250.  

The Nokia 6610i was essentially the same phone in terms of features, but featured a more conservative design to appeal more to business users while the 7250i was intended to be a fashion-oriented phone. The Nokia 3200 also had a similar feature set, however, the 3200 was intended to be a more affordable youth-oriented phone and featured a different style graphical user interface derived from that of the Nokia 3100.

References

7250
Mobile phones introduced in 2003
Mobile phones with infrared transmitter